The 2003 Tippeligaen was the 59th completed season of top division football in Norway. 

Each team played 26 games with three points given for wins and one point for a draw. Number thirteen and fourteen were relegated, number twelve had to play two qualification matches (home and away) against number three in the 1. divisjon (where number one and two were directly promoted) for the last spot.

Overview

Summary
Rosenborg won their twelfth consecutive title and eighteenth top-flight title overall. They won with a margin of 14 points down to runners-up Bodø/Glimt and secured the title with five games to spare. Aalesund and Bryne were relegated to 1. divisjon.

Teams and locations

''Note: Table lists in alphabetical order.

League table

Relegation play-offs
Vålerenga won the qualification for the last spot in the 2004 Tippeligaen against Sandefjord with 5–3 on aggregate.

Results

Season statistics

Top scorers

Attendances

References

Eliteserien seasons
1
Norway
Norway